Eureka TV is a British children's television series about science that ran from 2001 to 2005 on the children's TV channel CBBC.

Presenters
 Fearne Cotton (series 1–2) 2001-2003
 Kate Heavenor (series 1–3) 2001-2005
 Mohini Sule (series 3) 2004-2005

Features
High Tech Eureka
The latest technology.

Micro Eureka
Showed an everyday object, magnified hundreds of times.

Little Eureka
A science experiment using everyday objects.

Wild Eureka
About animals.

Big Eureka
Mysteries from the world of science.

Paper Eureka
Things to do with an A4 sheet of paper.

Eureka Mondays
Presenters

 Mohini Sule – main morning presenter
 Sophie McDonell – helper morning presenter/morning continuity presenter
 Kate Heavenor – main afternoon presenter
 Angellica Bell – afternoon continuity presenter
 Andrew Hayden-Smith – helper afternoon presenter/afternoon continuity
 Holly Willoughby – relief presenter for all areas

Series

Series 1 (2001-2002)
The first series aired on 24 September 2001 and ended on 17 December 2001. The series was presented by Kate Heavenor and Fearne Cotton. This series had all of the features above except for Paper and Micro Eureka.

Series 2 (2003)
The series was the second which aired midway through 2003, it was put off an extra few months than intended because of the new science show X-perimental which was presented by Ortis Deley and Holly Willoughby. In the series there was the addition of Paper and Micro Eureka.

Series 3 (2004-2005)
This was the final series, which was presented by Mohini Sule and Kate Heavoner. Eureka Mondays was added, on BBC One and BBC Two, presented by Monhini Sule and Sophie McDonnell in the morning and Kate Heavoner along with Angellica Bell and Andrew Hayden Smith in the afternoons. All the same features remained in this series as in the series before.

References

External links

BBC children's television shows
2000s British children's television series
2001 British television series debuts
2005 British television series endings
Science education television series